2023 Tour may refer to:
 2023 Tour de France
 Springsteen and E Street Band 2023 Tour
 Any other concert tour in